Spoiled Children is a 1977 French drama film directed by Bertrand Tavernier.

Cast
 Michel Piccoli - Bernard Rougerie
 Christine Pascal - Anne Torrini
 Michel Aumont - Pierre
 Gérard Jugnot - Marcel Bonfils
 Arlette Bonnard - Catherine Rougerie
 Liza Braconnier - Danièle Joffroy
 Geneviève Mnich - Guite Bonfils
 Florence Haguenauer - Anne-Marie Clairon
 Claudine Mavros - La mère d'Anne
 Michel Berto - Muzard
 Thierry Lhermitte - Stéphane Lecouvette
 Georges Riquier - Mouchot
 Gérard Zimmermann - Patrice Joffroy (as Gérard Zimmerman)
 Michel Blanc - Le jeune homme de l'agence
 Brigitte Catillon - Valérie
 Martin Lamotte - Un ami d'Anne
 Michel Puterflam - Baraduc
 Daniel Toscan du Plantier - Le député
 Isabelle Huppert - La secrétaire du député (uncredited)

See also
 Isabelle Huppert on screen and stage

References

External links

1977 films
1970s French-language films
1977 drama films
Films directed by Bertrand Tavernier
Films scored by Philippe Sarde
French drama films
1970s French films